Jocelyne Roupioz is a former French slalom canoeist who competed from the mid-1970s to the early 1980s. She won a bronze medal in the K-1 event at the 1981 ICF Canoe Slalom World Championships in Bala, Gwynedd, Wales.

References

French female canoeists
Living people
Year of birth missing (living people)
Medalists at the ICF Canoe Slalom World Championships